Auroville (City of Dawn French: Cité de l'aube) is an experimental township in Viluppuram district, mostly in the state of Tamil Nadu, India, with some parts in the Union Territory of Pondicherry in India. It was founded in 1968 by Mirra Alfassa (known as "the Mother") and designed by architect Roger Anger.

Etymology
Auroville has its origins in the French language, "Aurore" meaning dawn and "Ville" meaning village/city. Additionally, it is named after Sri Aurobindo (1872–1950).

History

At its Annual Conference in 1964 and with Mirra Alfassa as its Executive President, the Sri Aurobindo Society in Pondicherry passed a resolution for the establishment of a city dedicated to the vision of Sri Aurobindo. Alfassa was the spiritual collaborator of Sri Aurobindo, who believed that "man is a transitional being". Alfassa expected that this experimental "universal township" would contribute significantly to the "progress of humanity towards its splendid future by bringing together people of goodwill and aspiration for a better world". Alfassa also believed that such a universal township will contribute decisively to the Indian renaissance.

Alfassa's first public message in 1965 stated:

Site
A site, approximately 20 square kilometres of barren wasteland, some 10 km north of Pondicherry and 5 km from the coast, was chosen for the city.

Inauguration
The inauguration ceremony attended by delegates of 124 nations was held on Wednesday 28 February 1968. Handwritten in French by Mirra Alfassa (the Mother), its four-point charter set forth her vision of integral living:

 Auroville belongs to nobody in particular. Auroville belongs to humanity as a whole. But to live in Auroville, one must be the willing servitor of the Divine Consciousness.
 Auroville will be the place of an unending education, of constant progress, and a youth that never ages.
 Auroville wants to be the bridge between the past and the future. Taking advantage of all discoveries from without and from within, Auroville will boldly spring towards future realizations.
 Auroville will be a site of material and spiritual researches for a living embodiment of an actual human unity.

The Matrimandir

In the middle of the town is the Matrimandir, which was conceived by Alfassa as "a symbol of the Divine's answer to man's aspiration for perfection". Silence is maintained inside the Matrimandir to ensure the tranquility of the space, and the entire area surrounding the Matrimandir is called the Peace area. Inside the Matrimandir, a spiraling ramp leads upwards to an air-conditioned chamber of polished white marble referred to as "a place to find one's consciousness".

Matrimandir is equipped with a solar power plant and is surrounded by manicured gardens. When there is no sun, the sunray on the globe is replaced by a beam from a solar-powered light.

Radiating from this center are four "zones" of the City Area: the "Residential Zone", "Industrial Zone", "Cultural (& Educational) Zone" and "International Zone". Around the city or the urban area, lies a Green Belt which is an environmental research and resource area and includes farms and forestries, a botanical garden, seed bank, medicinal and herbal plants, water catchment bunds, and some communities.

Legal status and government
Prior to 1980, the Sri Aurobindo Society legally owned all of the city's assets. In 1980, the Government of India passed the Auroville Emergency Provision Act 1980, under which it took over the city's management. The change was initiated when, after Mirra Alfassa's death in 1973, serious fissures in the day-to-day management developed between the Society and the city's residents. The residents appealed to Indira Gandhi, then Prime Minister of India for an intervention. The Society challenged the Government's action in the Supreme Court of India. The final verdict upheld the constitutional validity of the government's action and intervention.

In 1988, after the verdict, a need was felt to make a lasting arrangement for the long term management of Auroville. The city's representatives along with Sh. Kireet Joshi, then Educational Advisor to the Union government, met for consultations with the then Prime Minister, Rajiv Gandhi. Later that year, the Auroville Foundation Act 1988, was passed by the Indian Parliament. The Act stipulated the vesting of all movable and immovable assets of the city in a foundation, known as Auroville Foundation and the creation of a three-tier governing system: the Governing Board; the Residents' Assembly and the Auroville International Advisory Council. The Governing Board selected by the Government of India consists of seven prominent Indians in the fields of education, culture, environment and social service in the areas of Auroville's ideals. The International Advisory Council comprises five members also selected by the Government, chosen from people who have rendered valuable service to humanity in the areas of Auroville's ideals. The Resident's Assembly consists of all official residents of the city. All three governing bodies are meant to work in harmony and collaborate to accomplish the ideals of Auroville as mentioned in the charter,  as per processes defined in the Auroville Foundation Act

The Auroville Foundation, headed by a chairman, is an autonomous body under the Ministry of Human Resource Development. The HRD ministry appoints the seven members of the Governing Board and the five members of the International Advisory Council. There is also a Secretary to the Foundation, appointed by the Government of India, who resides and has an office with supporting staff in Auroville. The Foundation currently owns about half of the total land required for the township. The remaining lands are being purchased whenever funds are available.

Chairmen
 Karan Singh – former Union Minister, 1991
 Dr. M. S. Swaminathan – renowned agricultural scientist
 Dr. Kireet Joshi – former Special Educational Advisor to the Government of India

Society and population

The township was originally intended to house 50,000 residents. In the initial 20 years, only about 400 individuals from 20 countries resided in the township. In the next 20 years, this number rose to 2,000 individuals from 40 countries. , it has 2,814 residents (2,127 adults and 687 children) from 54 countries with two-thirds from India, France and Germany. The community is divided up into neighborhoods with Tamil, English, French and Sanskrit names like Aspiration, Arati, La Ferme, Auromodel and Isaiambalam.

Demographics
The population break-down:

Surrounding villages
Auroville works closely together with the surrounding villages, where mainly Tamil people reside, via the Auroville Village Action Trust under which many different projects including the villages fall. The biggest one under the trust is the Auroville Village Action Group (AVAG), which has programs for women's empowerment, education, and financial support, and also sells its own products in the name of AVAL, Surya and Kudumbam as social enterprise work. Other activities falling under the trust are the Life Education Centre, Auroville Industrial School, Mohanam cultural centre, Auroville Health Services, Deepam school for handicapped children, Thamarai community centre, Martuvam Healing forest, and the Reach for the Stars! program enabling higher education for village youth. Concerns exist because of violence allegedly caused by criminal elements entering from the surrounding villages.

Economy
Instead of paper and coin currency, residents are given account numbers to connect to their central account. Visitors are requested to get a temporary account and an Aurocard, a special debit card for its citizens. 

Residents of Auroville are expected to make a monthly contribution to the community. They are asked to help the community whenever possible by work, money, or kind. The "guest contribution", or a daily fee paid by the guests of Auroville, constitutes a part of Auroville's budget. There is a system of "maintenance",  whereby those Aurovilians in need can receive from the community monthly maintenance which covers simple basic needs of life. Auroville's economy and its overall life are of an evolving nature and there are ongoing experiments to reach closer to the vision.

The Government of India only finances a small amount of Auroville's budget, which is mainly formed by contributions from Auroville's commercial units which contribute 33% of their profits to Auroville's Central Fund and by donations, largely foreign, from Auroville's multiple international bases set up all over the world. There are guest houses, building construction units, information technology, small and medium scale businesses, producing and re-selling items such as handmade paper for stationery items, organic food, as well as producing its well-known incense sticks, which can be bought in Auroville's own shop in Puducherry. They are also sold online in India and abroad. Each of these units contributes a considerable part of their profits to the township. Over 5,000 people, mostly from the nearby localities, are employed in various sections and units of Auroville.

Other activities include afforestation, organic agriculture, basic educational research, health care, village development, appropriate technology, town planning, water table management, cultural activities, and community services.

Location

It can be easily reached via the East Coast Road (ECR) which connects Chennai and Pondicherry. The visitor center and Matrimandir can be reached by traveling  westwards from the signposted turnoff at the ECR Bommayapalayam. Turning east leads directly to Auroville's private beach called Repos, several hundred meters away.

Climate
The annual rainfall average is  mainly from the SW monsoon (June to Sept.) and NE monsoon (Nov to Dec) with a dry period of approx 6 months.

Communications and media
The Auroville website provides open as well as restricted forums for various projects, interests, organizations, and outreach which make up the life of the community. The opinions expressed in these publications are not necessarily those of the community at large. The Auroville radio website provides recordings and daily news covering local events. Auroville also has an internal 'OutreachMedia' team to regulate visits of journalists and film/video makers, which has served the community for many decades. Their aim is to ensure that all journalists and filmmakers get official, up-to-date information and representative footage from reliable sources. Owing to recent and ongoing developments within the community, this team's legitimacy and sovereignty is currently under question.

BBC child abuse investigation
In May 2008, the BBC produced a 10-minute Newsnight film about Auroville, which was aired on BBC Two. A short version was aired on Radio 4's "From Our Own Correspondent". It also appeared on BBC Online. The reports contrasted the idealism of its founders with allegations by some people that the community tolerates pedophiles, especially in a school that Auroville has established for local village children. 

Auroville filed an official complaint to the BBC that the report was biased, untrue and contravened BBC editorial ethical guidelines. After investigations, Ofcom did not uphold the complaint.

Controversial development plans 
On December 4th, 2021, local police, joined by a group of outsiders, began demolishing the Auroville Youth Centre – uprooting the surrounding trees with the help of earthmovers. Despite the protests by the residents, on December 5, more than 900 trees were bulldozed across 67 acres in Auroville. An internal petition signed by more than 500 Auroville residents requested postponement of the development work on the Crown Road ‘Right of Way’, until the Auroville community would arrive at a collective agreement on a practical way forward.  An application filed by some residents of Auroville against the ongoing illegal clearing of forests by the Auroville Foundation led the Southern Bench of the National Green Tribunal (NGT) of India to order an interim stay on felling of trees on the 17th of December, 2021. This ban against tree felling inside Auroville was extended by the NGT until the next court hearing on January 3. The verdict was announced on April 28th, 2022, which directed the Auroville Foundation Office to prepare a proper township plan and apply for Environmental Clearance (EC) under Item 8 (b) of the EIA Notification, 2006. Till then they were directed not to proceed with further construction in the project area with the exception of ets the completion of the crown road given a Joint Committee comprising officials in forest, wildlife, and state departments inspect the area in question and the Auroville Foundation Office undertake the crown road work in the remaining stretches where there are no trees.

50th anniversary
By occasion of the 50th anniversary of Auroville on 28 February 2018 the Indian President Ram Nath Kovind sent a message to the community in which he called Sri Aurobindo "one of modern India's greatest sages". He also wrote that Auroville "represents humanity's aspiration for peace and goodwill" and that it is "a unique symbol of human unity".

Prime Minister Narendra Modi visited the Sri Aurobindo Ashram and Auroville on 25 February 2018. After a meditation in the Matrimandir and participation in some functions he gave a speech in the Sri Aurobindo Auditorium. He referred to the Auroville Charter and the basic principles of life in the community. Then he said, "Indian society is fundamentally diverse. It has fostered dialogue and a philosophic tradition. Auroville showcases this ancient Indian tradition to the world by bringing together global diversity." At the end of his speech, he expressed his wish that Auroville may continue developing and supporting new and creative ideas for India and the whole world.

Auroville In Popular Culture
At present, any filming within and about Auroville requires land permission from the Government of India. Many filmmakers visit Auroville, and a wide range of films are available. These include

 Ever Slow Green - Re-afforestation in Auroville, South India, full length, 56 minutes, 2020
 City of the Dawn, full length, 80 minutes, 2010
 Auroville, the outline of a world, full length, 25 minutes, 2009
 Auroville – A Dream of the Divine (part 1 and 2), full length, 20 minutes in two parts, 2003
 Spiritual journey... Auroville (Духовное путешествие... Ауровиль), six 25-minute videos on Auroville by Russian filmmakers, 2013
 The India Trip full length, 49 minutes, from the National Film Board of Canada, 1971
 Auroville topics can also be heard on Auroville Radio, and the films about Auroville screened at the biennial Auroville Film Festival.

Gallery

See also

Auroville Marathon
Arcosanti
Sacromonte
Planned Community

References

Bibliography
 English
 Abundance Publications. The Auroville Handbook.Pondicherry: All-India Press, 2007.
 Auroville  –  Development Perspectives 1993–1998  –  An Invitation To Participate, Typoscript, Autoren/Hrsg. Auroville Development Group, Bharat–Nivas, Auroville 1993, no ISBN
 K. M. Agarwala (Hrsg.): Auroville – The City Of Dawn, Sri Aurobindo Center New Delhi 1996, no ISBN
 Auroville References in Mother's Agenda, Auroville Press, Auroville, no Y., no ISBN
 Jerome Clayton Glenn: Linking the Future: Findhorn, Auroville Arcosanti, published by Hexiad Project/ Center on Technology and Society, Cambridge, Massachusetts 1979, no ISBN
 Anupama Kundoo: Roger Anger, Research on Beauty, Architecture 1953–2008, JOVIS Verlag Berlin 2009, 
 Jürgen Axer: Integrale Erziehung – Ein pädagogisches Konzept auf der Grundlage der Philosophie Sri Aurobindos. Dissertation Universität Köln. Verlag Wissenschaft und Politik, Köln 1983, ISBN 3-8046-8621-4.
 Peter Richards: Experience!Auroville  –  Guide Book for Guests and Visitors, Pondicherry 2000, no ISBN
 Savitra: Auroville: Sun-Word Rising  –  A Trust For The Earth, published by The Community of Auroville, Auroville 1980, no ISBN
 The Auroville Adventure  –  Selections from ten years of Auroville Today, published by Auroville Today, Auroville 1998, no ISBN
 The Auroville Experience  –  Selections from 202 issues of Auroville Today, November 1988 to November 2005, published by Auroville Today, Auroville 2006, no ISBN
 Jessica Namakkal, European Dreams, Tamil Land: Auroville and the Paradox of a Postcolonial Utopia, in Journal for the Study of Radicalism, Volume 6, Number 1, Spring 2012, pp. 59–88 (Published by Michigan State University Press)
 Xavier Pavie« Encouraging Young People to Develop Social Entrepreneurship in a Community the Case of Auroville ». Case center, reference n°320-0123-1. ESSEC Business School 2020.
 Xavier Pavie« Auroville, from utopia to responsible innovation: from the emergence of a utopian community to the development of entrepreneurial initiatives ». Case center, reference n°819-0026-1. ESSEC Business School 2019.

German
 Mira Alfassa: Die Mutter über Auroville, Auropublikations (Hrsg.), Sri Aurobindo Ashram Trust, Pondicherry 1978, no ISBN
 Renate Börger: Auroville  –  Eine Vision blüht, Verlag Connection Medien, Niedertaufkirchen 2004, 3. veränderte Aufl., 
 Alan G. (Hrsg.): Auroville  –  Ein Traum nimmt Gestalt an, o.O. (vermutlich Auroville/ Pondicherry) 1996, 1. dt. Aufl., no ISBN
 Michael Klostermann: Auroville  –  Stadt des Zukunftsmenschen; Fischer Taschenbuch Verlag, Frankfurt/M., Februar 1976;

External links

 
 Radio with daily updates from Auroville
 Auroville News
  (54 min)

 
Populated places established in 1968
1968 establishments in Madras State
Ecovillages
Hinduism in Tamil Nadu
Hinduism in Puducherry
Planned cities in India
Cities and towns in Viluppuram district
Schools affiliated with the Sri Aurobindo Ashram
Sri Aurobindo
Tourism in Tamil Nadu